Zappa in New York is a double live album by Frank Zappa released on his own DiscReet Records label. It was recorded in December 1976 at a series of concerts at the Palladium in New York City. 

The album was scheduled for release in mid 1977 but it was not generally available until March 1978. The album reached #57 on the Billboard 200 albums chart in the United States.

Music
The album features a variety of rock and jazz-rock tracks. "Sofa" and "Big Leg Emma" had appeared in different arrangements on previous Zappa records, while the other songs were entirely new. Backing musicians include a full horn section, containing members of the Saturday Night Live band, including Lou Marini and Tom Malone, as well as the Brecker Brothers. In addition, Don Pardo was invited by Zappa to the Palladium concerts, and he provides introductory narrations to "Punky's Whips" and "The Illinois Enema Bandit." After the December 1976 live performances Zappa spent time in the studio in early 1977 adding a significant number of overdubs, including additional percussion parts from Ruth Underwood, John Bergamo, and Ed Mann.

History
Zappa's DiscReet Records label was distributed by Warner Bros. Records. Zappa delivered four new individual albums to Warner for release on DiscReet in March 1977 to complete his contract. According to the contract Warner was required to pay Zappa $60,000 per album ($240,000 total) and release the recordings in the United States within six weeks. However, Warner failed to follow through on these terms. 

The four individual albums delivered in March 1977 were Zappa In New York, Studio Tan, Sleep Dirt and Orchestral Favorites. Since Zappa In New York was configured as two LP set, the complete four album collection actually contains a total of five full length LPs.

Warner later scheduled the release of Zappa in New York on DiscReet in mid 1977. A "Dateline Burbank" ad in the June 30, 1977 issue of Rolling Stone magazine described the release of the album as "imminent". A few uncensored and full length copies appeared by late 1977 but the album was quickly pulled from stores. Warner was forced to withdraw it by November due to legal action. Zappa objected to the release at this time. He also claimed that Warner first began to manufacture the album only when they heard he had negotiated to release the recordings with a competing company. The full eleven song uncensored 1977 version of the album has never been officially re-issued. 

Much of the material from these four individual albums was also edited by Zappa into a four-LP box set called Läther. Zappa announced this album in a mid September 1977 interview where he described it as his "current album". Zappa negotiated a distribution deal with Phonogram Inc. to release Läther as the first release on the Zappa Records label. The album was scheduled for a Halloween October 31, 1977 release date. But Warner claimed ownership of the material and threatened legal action, preventing the release of Läther and forcing Zappa to shelve the project.

Before re-issuing Zappa in New York in March 1978, Warner Bros. Records removed one of the longest songs, "Punky's Whips". The remaining songs were re-sequenced by moving "Big Leg Emma" from side two to side one. "Titties & Beer" was also edited to remove references to Punky Meadows, a member of the American glam rock band Angel. This cut more than 11 minutes from the album and reduced the playing time of side one to a mere ten minutes. The censorship and editing were done by Warner in violation of Zappa's contract. 

Several of the songs on this album were also included on the shelved album Läther, which finally released officially in 1996. These songs are "The Illinois Enema Bandit", "The Black Page #1", "Big Leg Emma", "Titties and Beer”, “Punky's Whips", "The Purple Lagoon" and "I Promise Not to Come in Your Mouth" (under the title "Läther".)

CD release 1991
Zappa re-issued Zappa in New York as a double CD album in 1991 with the addition of four bonus tracks ("Cruisin' for Burgers", "Punky's Whips", "I'm the Slime", "The Torture Never Stops"). The CD reissue was remixed to feature guitar overdubs that were recorded in 1976 but not included in previous releases. The CD reissue contained an alternate recording of "Punky's Whips" and the full-length recording of "Titties & Beer". On this version, Pardo also delivers a verse of "I'm the Slime" (he did the same for Zappa's 1976 Saturday Night Live appearance).

40th Anniversary releases 2019
For the 40th anniversary in 2019 there were two re-issues - a three-LP set and a five-CD deluxe box. The three-LP set combines the 1978 two-LP release with a bonus LP of vault material. The five-CD set was packaged in an embossed tin box shaped to look like a NYC street manhole cover. The five-CD box claims to contain the original uncensored 1977 vinyl version with eleven songs, however it is actually an edited ten song version. This version also features over three hours of bonus live performances from the four nights at the Palladium, and a fifth disc of vault material (including a song left off the LP due to time constraints), plus a replica of a Palladium show ticket.

Track listing

Original 1977 LP version

Edited 1978 LP version

1991 2CD version

2019 40th Anniversary vinyl pressing

2019 40th Anniversary 5CD box set

Musicians
 Frank Zappa – conductor, lead guitar, vocals, producer; guitar overdubs
 Ray White – rhythm guitar, vocals
 Eddie Jobson – keyboards, violin, vocals
 Patrick O'Hearn – bass guitar, vocals
 Terry Bozzio – drums, vocals
 Ruth Underwood – percussion, synthesizer, and various humanly impossible overdubs
 Lou Marini – alto sax, flute
 Mike Brecker – tenor sax, flute
 Ronnie Cuber – baritone sax, clarinet
 Randy Brecker – trumpet
 Tom Malone – trombone, trumpet, piccolo
 Don Pardo – sophisticated narration
 David Samuels – timpani, vibes
 John Bergamo – percussion overdubs
 Ed Mann – percussion overdubs
 Lou Anne Neill – osmotic harp overdub

Production staff
 Frank Zappa – production
 Bob Liftin – NYC live remote engineer
 Davey Moire – NYC live concert mix, studio engineer (overdubs)
 Rick Smith – studio engineer (overdubs)
 John Williams – package design
 Dweezil Zappa – cover photo
 Gail Zappa – other photos

Charts

References

1978 live albums
Albums produced by Frank Zappa
DiscReet Records albums
Frank Zappa live albums
Albums recorded at the Palladium (New York City)